Asep Mulyana or sometimes called Ato (born October 7, 1989) is an Indonesian footballer who currently plays for PSGC Ciamis.

Career 
In January 2015, he signed with PSGC.

References

External links 
 

1989 births
Living people
Indonesian footballers
Liga 1 (Indonesia) players
Indonesian Premier Division players
Pelita Bandung Raya players
Sportspeople from Bandung
Association football midfielders